Bellflower Township is located in McLean County, Illinois. As of the 2010 census, its population was 585 and it contained 267 housing units. Bellflower Township changed its name from Prairie Township on May 17, 1858.

Geography

Demographics

References

External links
City-data.com
Illinois State Archives

Townships in McLean County, Illinois
Populated places established in 1858
1858 establishments in Illinois
Townships in Illinois